Claduncaria is a genus of moths belonging to the family Tortricidae.

Species
 Claduncaria maestrana Razowski & Becker, 2010
 Claduncaria ochrochlaena (Razowski, 1999)
 Claduncaria rufochlaena Razowski & Becker, 2000

See also
 List of Tortricidae genera

References

 , 2005: World Catalogue of Insects vol. 5 Tortricidae.
 , 2010: Systematic and distributional data on Neotropical Archipini (Lepidoptera: Tortricidae). Acta Zoologica Cracoviensia 53B (1-2): 9-38. . Full article:  .

External links
 tortricidae.com

Archipini
Tortricidae genera
Taxa named by Józef Razowski